Prisches is a commune in the Nord department in northern France.

History

Catharina Trico, born at Prisches (then part of the Spanish Netherlands) emigrated in the early 17th Century to Amsterdam. On January 13, 1624, she - 18 years old at the time - married a fellow Walloon immigrant, Joris Raparlie from Valenciennes, the record of their marriage surviving in Amsterdam archives. The two of them soon afterwards boarded a Dutch ship bound for North America and were among the founders and original inhabitants of New Amsterdam - which eventually became the present New York City. Further surviving documents indicate that Catharina and Joris had eleven children, that he died in 1662 but that she was still alive in 1680 - when an English missionary encountered her on Long Island as an old matriarch with 145 descendants. Genealogists estimate that more than a million people now living, in the US and elsewhere, can trace their descent to her.

Heraldry

See also
Communes of the Nord department

References

Communes of Nord (French department)